Admiral Henry Coare Kingsford (7 January 1858 – 1 March 1941) was a Royal Navy officer.

He was the head of the Victorian Naval Forces from 1894.

References 

1858 births
1941 deaths
Royal Navy admirals